Present – The Very Best of Steeleye Span is the 17th studio album by Steeleye Span, released in 2002. The album contains new recordings of previously released songs.

The project began with a poll on Peter Knight's website, asking fans about which of the band's songs they would most like to see new versions of. At the time the poll was taken, the band was a state of near-collapse. Personal tensions during the recording of Bedlam Born had led to the departure of Gay Woods and Tim Harries, and health problems had induced Bob Johnson into retirement. When the poll was completed, Knight persuaded several past members of the band, Maddy Prior, Rick Kemp and Liam Genockey, to return to the studio; and he also coaxed Johnson out of retirement. The newly reformed line-up, similar to the band's famous mid-1970s membership, released the results as a two-disc set in 2002.

The majority of the songs are modest variations on the original versions. For example, songs such as "Sir James the Rose", "Black Jack Davey", "All Around My Hat", and "King Henry" are not radically different from their original studio versions, although there are changes in orchestration, particularly the general addition of the octave violin to many of the songs. Maddy Prior often modifies her singing style or emphasizes different words from the original version. About the only substantial change in "Gaudete" is the pronunciation of some of the Latin. On "Cam Ye O'er Frae France", Prior enunciates more, making the lyrics much more intelligible than on the Parcel of Rogues version. "Rosebud in June" is slightly faster than the original; and Prior sings the whole piece unaccompanied, while the original features the whole band singing on the chorus. The version of "One Misty Moisty Morning" is very similar to the studio version, but much slower than the way the band normally play it live. A few songs are given brief instrumental endings.

However, a few of the songs are quite different from their original version. The studio version of "Hard Times of Old England" is very upbeat, in contrast with the song's lyrics about economic hardship; but the new version is much slower and more melancholy, almost as if it were being sung in a church, with Prior being backed up by Knight playing an organ. Perhaps the biggest change is on "When I Was On Horseback". The original version, from Ten Man Mop, or Mr. Reservoir Butler Rides Again, is a slow, sorrowful funeral tune, but the new version is a mid-tempo rock piece, with a driving violin, a brisk guitar line, and a strong drum beat. "Blackleg Miner" gets a second makeover; although the new version is closer to the version on Back in Line than the original on Hark! The Village Wait, it is distinct from both earlier versions, with Kemp's slap bass and a strong violin line.

"Let Her Go Down" employs a different set of lyrics from the version on Sails of Silver, reportedly closer to what Knight had originally intended for the song. This song is the only non-traditional piece on the album.

The original version of "Thomas the Rhymer" was a six-minute song that alternated rock and acoustic elements. However, when Now We Are Six was released in America, the band substituted a three-minute version of the song that was more thoroughly rock-style, and which was judged to be more radio-friendly. Almost all the subsequent re-releases of Now We Are Six contained the three-minute version of the song. On this album, however, the band chose to go back to the six-minute version, which is how they had normally played the song in concert; they offered a variation on the song's acoustic moments, while keeping the rock moments relatively intact. Until the release of the compilation A Parcel of Steeleye Span, this was the most easily available version of the original six-minute form of the song.

The album includes one song the band had never recorded before, "Lyke-Wake Dirge". This was a song that the band had frequently performed live (for example, during their US tour in support of Jethro Tull, the band processed onto stage singing this song a cappella), but only now got around to offering a recording of it.

The song selection very heavily leans toward the band's mid-1970s heyday, with one song from Hark! The Village Wait; one from Ten Man Mop; four from Below the Salt; three from Parcel of Rogues; two from Now We Are Six; one from Commoners Crown; three from All Around My Hat; and one each from Rocket Cottage and Sails of Silver. The band's later work, from Tempted and Tried, Time, Horkstow Grange and Bedlam Born, is entirely passed over. Assuming that the contents of the album substantially represent fan opinion from the poll, this would suggest that the band's fans have a strong preference for the band's mid-1970s material.

According to the liner notes, the album's title is a three-sided pun, playing on the different meanings of 'present', including 'a gift', 'now', and 'here'.

Personnel
Maddy Prior - vocals
Rick Kemp - bass, vocals, guitar
Peter Knight - organ, mandolin, octave violin, violin, electric violin, vocals, piano
Bob Johnson - acoustic guitar, electric guitar, vocals
Liam Genockey - drums, cymbals

Track listing
Disc 1:
"Sir James the Rose"
"Hard Times of Old England"
"Cam Ye O'er Frae France"
"Thomas the Rhymer"
"Lyke-Wake Dirge"
"Black Jack Davey"
"Two Magicians"
"Blackleg Miner"
"All Around My Hat"

Disc 2:
"When I Was On Horseback"
"John Barleycorn"
"Long Lankin" (Roud 6, Child 93)
"One Misty Moisty Morning"
"Let Her Go Down"
"Gaudete"
"The Weaver and the Factory Maid"
"Drink Down the Moon"
"King Henry"
"Rosebud in June (hidden track)"

Steeleye Span albums
2002 albums